Baculoviral IAP repeat-containing protein 6 is a protein that in humans is encoded by the BIRC6 gene.

Function 

This gene encodes a protein with a BIR (baculoviral inhibition of apoptosis protein repeat) domain and a UBCc (ubiquitin-conjugating enzyme E2, catalytic) domain. This protein inhibits apoptosis by facilitating the degradation of apoptotic proteins by ubiquitination.

Interactions 

BIRC6 has been shown to interact with KIF23.

Diseases 

BIRC6 is implicated in leukemia, melanoma, breast cancer, lung cancer, colorectal cancer, and other cancers (see the Atlas of Genetics and Cytogenetics in Oncology and Haematology).

References

External links
 
 PDBe-KB provides an overview of all the structure information available in the PDB for Human Baculoviral IAP repeat-containing protein 6

Further reading